Ukrainian Catholic Church may refer to:

 Latin Church in Ukraine 
 Greek Catholic Churches (Eastern Catholic communities of the Byzantine Rite, centered in Ukraine, in communion with the Church of Rome)
Ruthenian Greek Catholic Church
Ukrainian Greek Catholic Church
 the Armenian Catholic Archeparchy of Lviv
 Ukrainian Orthodox Greek Catholic Church, an independent/Sedevacantist Ukrainian Greek-Catholic Church that was established in 2008 from the official Ukrainian Greek-Catholic Church, which self-identifies as both Orthodox and Catholic

See also 
 Ukrainian Church (disambiguation)
 Ukrainian Orthodox Church (disambiguation)
 Albanian Catholic Church
 Belarusian Catholic Church
 Bulgarian Catholic Church
 Croatian Catholic Church
 Greek Catholic Church
 Hungarian Catholic Church
 Romanian Catholic Church
 Russian Catholic Church
 Serbian Catholic Church
 Slovak Catholic Church